Cranmoor is a town in Wood County, Wisconsin, United States. The population was 175 at the 2000 census. The unincorporated communities of Cranmoor and Walker are located in the town.

Geography
According to the United States Census Bureau, the town has a total area of 42.3 square miles (109.7 km2), of which, 36.7 square miles (95.2 km2) of it is land and 5.6 square miles (14.5 km2) of it (13.23%) is water.

History

Southern bits of Cranmoor were surveyed in 1839, early because they were within three miles of the Wisconsin River, touching the "Indian strip" which was sold by the Menominees to the U.S. government in the 1836 Treaty of the Cedars.

In the winter of 1851–1852 a crew working for the U.S. government surveyed all the section corners of the land that would become Cranmoor, walking through the woods and probably crossing the marshes on the ice, measuring with chain and compass. When done, the deputy surveyor filed this general description of the six mile square that now includes northwest Cranmoor:
This Township is very nearly all covered either with Marsh or swamp there is not to exceed in the Township two Sections of land that would admit of cultivation and that in detached parcels, not exceeding 20 acres in any one tract. The division between the open Marsh and swamp, which is more or less timber & extends from the S.W. Corner of the Township to the South east Corner of Section 12, surrounding the corners to Sec. 13. 14. 23. & 24. is an almost impenetrable swamp of Black alders(?) embracing about one Section of land. Timber on Swamp Tamarack & small Spruce(?) very thick. water from 6 to 20 inches deep, the marsh is covered with a light crop of grass, water from 12 to 40 inches deep, innumerable small Islands(?) interspered over this Town, the margins of which abound with Cranberries.

Cranmoor township was established in 1903, taking its name from the community of Cranmoor.

Demographics
As of the census of 2000, there were 175 people, 66 households, and 48 families residing in the town. The population density was 4.8 people per square mile (1.8/km2). There were 75 housing units at an average density of 2.0 per square mile (0.8/km2). The racial makeup of the town was 85.14% White, 10.29% Native American, 0.57% Asian, 2.86% from other races, and 1.14% from two or more races. Hispanic or Latino of any race were 3.43% of the population.

There were 66 households, out of which 31.8% had children under the age of 18 living with them, 66.7% were married couples living together, 3.0% had a female householder with no husband present, and 25.8% were non-families. 21.2% of all households were made up of individuals, and 10.6% had someone living alone who was 65 years of age or older. The average household size was 2.65 and the average family size was 3.04.

In the town, the population was spread out, with 26.3% under the age of 18, 8.0% from 18 to 24, 29.1% from 25 to 44, 22.9% from 45 to 64, and 13.7% who were 65 years of age or older. The median age was 38 years. For every 100 females, there were 103.5 males. For every 100 females age 18 and over, there were 101.6 males.

The median income for a household in the town was $46,250, and the median income for a family was $53,500. Males had a median income of $29,688 versus $24,375 for females. The per capita income for the town was $28,727. About 5.8% of families and 10.8% of the population were below the poverty line, including 13.8% of those under the age of eighteen and none of those 65 or over.

References

External links 
 1852 plat map covering NW Cranmoor
 1852 plat map covering south Cranmoor
 1879 plat map covering NW Cranmoor
 1879 plat map covering south Cranmoor
 1896 plat map covering NW Cranmoor
 1896 plat map covering south Cranmoor
 1909 plat map of all of Cranmoor
 1928 plat map of all of Cranmoor
 1956 plat map covering NW Cranmoor
 1956 plat map covering south Cranmoor
 For plats of the easternmost mile of Cranmoor, in T22N R5E, see the links under Seneca.

Towns in Wood County, Wisconsin
Towns in Wisconsin